Blabbermouth is a play by Australian playwright Mary Morris, adapted from the book of the same name by Morris Gleitzman.

Plot
The play concerns a young girl, Rowena, who moves to a new country town and school. Although Rowena can hear she is mute. Her widowed father has a penchant for satin cowboy shirts and embarrassing his daughter in public. This is a story about disability, friendship, fitting in, and how children and adults try to co-exist.

Original production
Blabbermouth was first produced by the Melbourne Theatre Company at The Fairfax, Victorian Arts Centre, 10 September 1993 with the following cast:
 DAD:	Michael Bishop
 ROWENA BATTS:	Doris Younane
 DARRYN/MR COSGROVE/MR FOWLER/AUCTIONEER/OFFICER/ANDY:	Patrick Moffatt
 MS DUNNING/YOBBO/MRS GRANGER: 	Merridy Eastman
 AMANDA/YOBBO:	Sally Cooper
 MRS COSGROVE/MEGAN/YOBBO:	Jane Turner
 Directed by David Carlin
 Designed by Trina Parker
 Lighting by Greg Diamantis

References

Australian plays
1993 plays